The Paradise River in Washington state, United States, is known for having a total of eight major waterfalls.

Paradise Falls 

Sluiskin Falls 

It is only  shorter than Narada Falls. The falls occur where the river, still small at this point, drops into Paradise Valley.

Like Paradise Falls, it would be very easy to reach the base of the falls however, since off trail travel isn’t allowed, one has to stick with long distance views from the trail.

General Hazard Stevens and Philemon Beecher Van Trump were the ones who named the falls.  They named it after a local Indian named Sluiskin who guided them to the first ascent of Mount Baker in 1870.

Ruby Falls 

One of the most forgotten waterfalls in the area, Ruby Falls consists of 2 major tiers, first a  cascade and then a  plunge. There is a bridge situated between the 2 tiers.

Washington Cascades 

No single drop is higher than 30 feet. 

Henry Schwargel named the falls simply for the state of Washington.  Some sources call the falls the Washington Torrents.

Narada Falls

Sidewinder Cascades 

Madcap Falls 

Most topo maps have placed Madcap Falls at incorrect locations along the river.  Some show the falls right at the mouth of Tatoosh Creek, however it has been proved there is no waterfall there.  There is a possibility that the waterfall currently known as Carter Falls is actually Madcap Falls, and Carter Falls lies further downstream.

Carter Falls 

There is a small upper tier of an unknown height just above the main drop. 

There is a possibility that the actual Carter falls lies further downstream and that the waterfall currently known as Carter Falls is Madcap Falls. 

Henry Carter, who built the first trail to the Paradise Valley, named the falls between 1889 and 1900.

See also 
 Nisqually River

References 

Landforms of Lewis County, Washington
Mount Rainier National Park
Waterfalls of Pierce County, Washington
Waterfalls of Washington (state)